Alaux is a surname. Notable people with the surname include,

 Aline Alaux (1813–1856), French artist
 Fanny Alaux (1797–1880), French painter
 Jean Alaux (1786–1864), French artist
 Jean-Paul Alaux (1788–1858), French landscape painter
 Michel Alaux (1924–1974), French-American fencing master